Flor Angela Velázquez Artahona (born May 2, 1984) is a female judoka from Venezuela, who won the bronze medal in the women's half lightweight division (– 52 kg) at the 2003 Pan American Games in Santo Domingo, Dominican Republic. She represented her native country in two consecutive Summer Olympics, starting in 2004.

References

1984 births
Living people
Venezuelan female judoka
Judoka at the 2004 Summer Olympics
Judoka at the 2008 Summer Olympics
Olympic judoka of Venezuela
Judoka at the 2003 Pan American Games
Judoka at the 2007 Pan American Games
Judoka at the 2011 Pan American Games
Pan American Games bronze medalists for Venezuela
Pan American Games medalists in judo
South American Games bronze medalists for Venezuela
South American Games medalists in judo
Competitors at the 2006 South American Games
Medalists at the 2003 Pan American Games
Medalists at the 2007 Pan American Games
20th-century Venezuelan women
21st-century Venezuelan women